Elizabeth Secor Anderson (born December 5, 1959) is an American philosopher. She is Arthur F. Thurnau Professor and John Dewey Distinguished University Professor of Philosophy and Women's Studies at the University of Michigan and specializes in political philosophy, ethics, and feminist philosophy.

Education and career
Raised in Manchester, Connecticut, Anderson graduated from Manchester High School in 1977. Her father, an engineer for United Technologies, got her interested in philosophy by reading John Stuart Mill and Plato with her.

Anderson received a B.A. with high honors in philosophy with a minor in economics from Swarthmore College in 1981.  In 1987 Anderson completed a Ph.D. in Philosophy at Harvard University.  She was a visiting instructor of philosophy at Swarthmore College (1985–86) and took up a position at the University of Michigan in 1987.  She was Associate Professor of Philosophy and Women's Studies from 1993 to 1999 and was promoted to professor in 1999.  In 1994, she was named Arthur F. Thurnau Professor to recognize her dedication to undergraduate education with a demonstrable impact on the intellectual development and lives of her students.  In 2005, she was named John Rawls Collegiate Professor of Philosophy and Women's Studies, and in 2013 the John Dewey Distinguished University Professor of Philosophy and Women's Studies.

Anderson was elected to the American Academy of Arts and Sciences in 2008.  In 2013, Anderson received a Guggenheim Fellowship to support her work.  Anderson was named a Progress Medal Laureate in February 2018 by the Society for Progress for her book Private Government: How Employers Rule Our Lives (and Why We Don't Talk about It).  In 2019, she received a "Genius Grant" from the MacArthur Fellows Program. Anderson was also among the unranked bottom 40 in the 2020 Prospect list of the top 50 thinkers for the COVID-19 era. In 2021, she was elected to the American Philosophical Society.

Philosophical work
Anderson's research covers topics in social philosophy, political philosophy and ethics, including: democratic theory, equality in political philosophy and American law, racial integration, the ethical limits of markets, theories of value and rational choice (alternatives to consequentialism and economic theories of rational choice), the philosophies of John Stuart Mill and John Dewey, and feminist epistemology and philosophy of science.

Anderson's most cited work is her article in Ethics journal, titled "What is the Point of Equality?" Within the article, she harshly criticises luck egalitarianism: a contemporaneously popular view espoused by writers such as Ronald Dworkin. She advocates for a more relational understanding of equality founded upon democratic principles.

Anderson's book The Imperative of Integration was winner of the American Philosophical Association's 2011 Joseph B. Gittler Award, for "an outstanding scholarly contribution in the field of the philosophy of one or more of the social sciences." She is also author of Value in Ethics and Economics, and dozens of articles.

Work ethic
In a variety of lectures and publications, Anderson has explored the work ethic in terms of its origins and continued influence on culture. Much of her work focuses on American culture and history, but is broadly influenced by, and applicable to European countries which prominently feature shareholder capitalism. Anderson reiterates Max Weber (in his 1905 The Protestant Ethic and the Spirit of Capitalism) who points to the Protestants, most prominently Richard Baxter, as being the originators of the work ethic. Calvinists believed that to enter heaven and become a saint, one must have faith. Baxter argued that there is no way to know by simple self reflection whether one has faith or not. Instead, one must look to action, specifically a person's work ethic. Laziness and sloth were seen as evidence of declining faith. In his The Saints Everlasting Rest (1650), Baxter set out the core tenets of the Protestant work ethic. Many formative puritan thinkers, such as Robert Sanderson, saw workers as doing their duty to God and promoted distinctly pro-worker values.

Eventually, these Protestant values became secularized by the classical liberals, such as Adam Smith, Thomas Paine, and John Stuart Mill; however, Anderson posits that two flavors of thought on the work ethic emerged: a conservative, pro-capital version as well as a progressive, pro-worker version. She argues that this was the result of the industrial revolution which split up craftspeople into a capital owning class and an immiserated working-class, or what is considered the precariat in the 21st century. She sees two versions of the work ethic: the progressive interpretations favored by workers, and the conservatives interpretation favored by capital owners.

Anderson goes on to argue that many of the neoliberal arguments are largely rooted in the works of Thomas Robert Malthus and Jeremy Bentham, and not the actual classical liberals. Malthus espoused stringent individual responsibility, arguing that people were poor because of their own laziness, promiscuity, and vices. Bentham originated the notion that private capitalists would be able to create more efficient delivery of services than the state could. In contrast, the classical liberals were distinctly more pro-worker, and inconsistent with modern-day conservatives' neoliberal values. Anderson argues there was a reversal in which capital owners reversed the ire away from the idle rich, onto the poor instead; however, in doing so, many of these ideas became contradictory. Anderson provides multiple examples: while conservatives argue against welfare because supposedly handouts cannot bring happiness, this argument is not used against the passive receipt of dividends. The idea of individual responsibility is often cited as a reason to not help debtors but is rarely leveled against creditors for having issued risky loans, or having already charged a risk premium. Anti-monopoly sentiments are often levied against unions but not against IP protection laws, nor the deconstruction of antitrust laws.

Personal life
Anderson is married to David R. Jacobi, a medical doctor practicing in Detroit, Michigan. The couple have two children named Sean and Benjamin.

Bibliography

Books

Chapters in books

Selected journal articles

References

External links 

 Elizabeth Anderson's web page
 Elizabeth Anderson's profile
 Where Despots Rule. Interview with Jacobin. June 2017.
 The Philosopher Redefining Equality. Profile in New Yorker. January 7, 2019.
 The ‘Private Governments’ That Subjugate U.S. Workers. Chris Hedges for Truthdig. January 14, 2019

1959 births
21st-century American philosophers
American political philosophers
Harvard Graduate School of Arts and Sciences alumni
Living people
MacArthur Fellows
Members of the American Philosophical Society
Michigan State University faculty
Philosophers from Michigan
Political philosophers
Swarthmore College alumni
University of Michigan faculty